Westminster St James (or St James Piccadilly)  was a civil parish in the metropolitan area of London, England. The creation of the parish followed the building of the Church of St James, Piccadilly, in 1684. After several failed attempts, the parish was formed in 1685 from part of the ancient parish of St Martin in the Fields in the Liberty of Westminster and county of Middlesex. It included part of the West End of London, taking in sections of Soho, Mayfair and St James's. Civil parish administration was in the hands of a select vestry until the parish adopted the Vestries Act 1831. The vestry was reformed again in 1855 by the Metropolis Management Act. In 1889 the parish became part of the County of London and the vestry was abolished in 1900, replaced by Westminster City Council. The parish continued to have nominal existence until 1922.

Creation
There were attempts in 1664, 1668 and 1670 to create a new parish, with its own church, from the area of the bailiwick of St James within the ancient parish of St Martin in the Fields. The creation of the new parish was resisted by the vestry of St Martin in the Fields. In 1684 the Church of St James, Piccadilly, was constructed which improved the case for providing a new parish.

It was created in 1685 from part of the ancient parish of St Martin in the Fields, and was within the Liberty of Westminster. The parish was included in the returns of the Bills of mortality.

The legislation creating the parish in 1685 provided for a select vestry of 34 vestrymen.

Geography
It corresponded to the western portion of the contemporary district of Soho, the eastern part of Mayfair and the northern part of St James's. To the north the boundary was along Oxford Street with St Marylebone, to the east it had a boundary with St Anne, Soho, running along Berwick Street and Rupert Street. To the south there was a boundary with St Martin in the Fields, roughly along Pall Mall. In the west there was a somewhat more irregular boundary with St George Hanover Square, partly following Conduit Street, Old Bond Street and Dover Street. The building of Regent Street in the early 19th century made the division of the parish between the Mayfair and Soho areas more defined.

Government
The parish adopted the Vestries Act 1831 and on 6 April 1832 there was an election of vestrymen by all ratepayers. In 1855 the parish vestry became a local authority within the area of responsibility of the Metropolitan Board of Works and the number of elected vestrymen increased by 12.

Under the Metropolis Management Act 1855 any parish that exceeded 2,000 ratepayers was to be divided into wards; as such the incorporated vestry of St James Westminster was divided into four wards (electing vestrymen): No. 1 or Great Marlborough (12), No. 2 or Pall Mall (12), No. 3 or Church (15) and No. 4 or Golden Square (9).

The Local Government Act 1894 reformed the method of election for London vestries, with the entire vestry replaced at an election held on 15 December 1894. One third of the vestry was then elected every year starting in 1896.

Poor law
The parish was independent for the administration of the New Poor Law, until it joined the Westminster Union in 1868.

Abolition
In 1889 the parish became part of the County of London and in 1900 it became part of the Metropolitan Borough of Westminster, with the parish vestry replaced by Westminster City Council. It was abolished as a civil parish in 1922.

Population
The population of the parish as recorded in the decennial census was:

References

History of local government in London (pre-1855)
History of the City of Westminster
Parishes governed by vestries (Metropolis)
Former civil parishes in London
1685 establishments in England
1922 disestablishments in England
Bills of mortality parishes